Boatwright is a surname of English origin, meaning boat builder. It is frequently spelt Boatright without the "w". The name may refer to:
 Brad Boatright, American musician, record producer, and mastering engineer
 Brian Boatright, justice of the Colorado Supreme Court
 Daniel E. Boatwright (born 1930), American politician from California; state legislator 1973–80
 Danni Boatwright (born 1975), American beauty queen, model, and TV personality
 Frederic W. Boatwright (1868–1951), American college president
 Helen Boatwright (1916–2010), American soprano who specialized in the performance of American song
 Jim Boatwright (1951–2013), American-Israeli basketball player
 John B. Boatwright (1881–1965), Virginia lawyer and legislator
 Kenneth Boatright, American football defensive end
 Mary T. Boatwright (born 1952), American professor of classical studies
 McHenry Boatwright (1928–1994), American operatic bass-baritone and singing teacher
 Peter Boatwright, American non-fiction writer and an Associate Professor of Marketing at the Tepper School of Business at Carnegie Mellon University
 Ryan Boatright (born 1992), American professional basketball player
 Todd Boatwright (born 1965), American television news anchor of News 8 Austin's weekday morning news

Fictional
 August, June and May Boatwright, fictional three sisters of the Sue Monk Kidd's novel The Secret Life of Bees
 Ruth Anne "Bone" Boatwright is the fictional narrator of Dorothy Allison's debut novel Bastard out of Carolina

See also

References 

Occupational surnames
English-language occupational surnames